Bertil Roos (October 12, 1943 – March 31, 2016) was a Swedish racing driver from Gothenburg. He participated in a single Formula One Grand Prix, his home race in 1974, from which he retired with transmission failure.

Career
Despite enjoying early promise in winning the US Formula Super Vee title in 1973, and also doing well in Formula 2 in Europe and Formula Atlantic in Canada, Roos only received one shot at Formula One.  He and his team, Shadow, did not get on particularly well, and ultimately the team chose to work with Tom Pryce instead.  Roos went back to the US and Canada, where he continued racing.

He was the senior driving instructor for the Fred Opert racing school in Pennsylvania, USA near Pocono Raceway, a business that he later purchased.

Still racing in the 1980s, Roos was a two-time Can-Am champion in the 2 liter and under category.

Roos died at Pocono Medical Center, East Stroudsburg Pennsylvania, on March 31, 2016.

Racing record

US Formula Super Vee

SCCA National Championship Runoffs

Complete Formula One results 
(key)

References

External links
Obituary
Driver Database Profile

1943 births
2016 deaths
Swedish racing drivers
Swedish Formula One drivers
Shadow Formula One drivers
European Formula Two Championship drivers
Atlantic Championship drivers
SCCA Formula Super Vee drivers
Formula Super Vee Champions
SCCA National Championship Runoffs participants
Sportspeople from Gothenburg